Lubień Kujawski is a town in Włocławek County, Kuyavian-Pomeranian Voivodeship, Poland, with 1,318 inhabitants (2004).

References 

Cities and towns in Kuyavian-Pomeranian Voivodeship
Włocławek County
Pomeranian Voivodeship (1919–1939)